The Southern Illinois Salukis women's basketball team represents Southern Illinois University Carbondale in Carbondale, Illinois. The Salukis compete in the Missouri Valley Conference.

History
Southern Illinois began play in 1959. The Salukis have won five regular season titles (1986, 1987, 1990, 2007, 2022) and two conference tournament titles (1987, 1990). They did not lose a conference game in two consecutive seasons from 1985 to 1987. they have made the NCAA Tournament in 1986, 1987, 1990, and 1992, making the Sweet Sixteen in 1987 (they gained a bye into the Second Round and beat LSU 70–56) before losing to Louisiana Tech 66–53. They made the Second Round in 1992 after beating Colorado 84–80, but they were beaten by Ole Miss 72–56. As of the end of the 2015–16 season, they have an all-time record of 663–641. They have made the WNIT five times, thrice in the first edition of the tournament (1969, 1970, 1983), and twice in its second version (2007, 2022). They have also made the Women's Basketball Invitational once, in 2016.

NCAA tournament results

Notable players

Retired jerseys
Southern Illinois has retired two jersey numbers.

References

External links